The 1981 Campeonato Brasileiro Série B, officially, the Taça de Prata 1981, was the 4th edition of the Campeonato Brasileiro Série B.The championship was performed by 48 clubs, divided into 6 groups of 8 teams each, in which the two best teams of each group proceeded to the second phase, in which the twelve teams were divided into four groups of three teams.the first placed team of each group were promoted to the Second phase of the Taça de Ouro of the same year. the second placed teams of each group would proceed to the semifinals, disputed in a knockout tournament format, in which the winners were promoted to the Taça de Ouro of the following year.

First phase

Group A

Group B

Group C

Group D

Group E

Group F

Second phase

Group G

Group H

Group I

Group G

Semifinals

|}

Finals

First leg

Second leg

References

Sources
 RSSSF

Campeonato Brasileiro Série B seasons
B